The 1981 Stockholm Open was a men's tennis tournament played on hard courts and part of the 1981 Volvo Grand Prix and took place at the Kungliga tennishallen in Stockholm, Sweden. It was the 13th edition of the tournament and was held from 2 November until 8 November 1981. Third-seeded Gene Mayer won the singles title after a victory in the final against his brother Sandy.

Finals

Singles

 Gene Mayer defeated  Sandy Mayer, 6–4, 6–2
 It was Mayer's 4th singles title of the year and the 11th of his career.

Doubles

 Kevin Curren /  Steve Denton defeated  Sherwood Stewart /  Ferdi Taygan, 6–7, 6–4, 6–0

References

External links
  
 ITF tournament edition details
 ATP tournament profile

Stockholm Open
Stockholm Open
Stockholm Open
Stockholm Open
1980s in Stockholm